Cristian Agustín Parano Rasguido (born 16 August 1999) is an Argentine professional footballer who plays as an attacking midfielder for USL Championship club San Antonio FC.

Career

Early career
Parano's early youth career included a spell with one of Barcelona's affiliate clubs in Buenos Aires from the age of nine, prior to the midfielder signing with Boca Juniors' academy in 2010. Four years later, he switched to rivals River Plate. In 2017, Parano moved to San Martín. His professional debut arrived on 4 May 2018 during a Primera División home defeat to Vélez Sarsfield, he had previously been an unused substitute for a fixture with Olimpo in April.

San Antonio FC
On 31 January 2019, following a successful trial, Parano joined USL Championship side San Antonio FC. His first senior goal came on 21 June in a loss at Chukchansi Park versus Fresno FC.

Parano scored a brace in USL over Reno 1868 on 10 August in a win away from home; for which he was voted as the league's Player of the Week. He netted his fifth goal of the campaign on 17 August, in what was his first South Texas Derby at home against Rio Grande Valley FC Toros. A week later, Parano scored two further goals - and got two assists - in a 5–0 win over New Mexico United; the club's biggest victory at that time. That performance won him the Player of the Week award, which he won for the second time in three weeks. He lost to Solomon Asante for the Player of the Month award for August; despite topping the fan vote.

Fresh from winning the league's 2019 Young Player of the Year award, Parano began the subsequent season with a goal on matchday one against rivals Rio Grande Valley FC Toros. He ended the campaign with four goals in fifteen matches as they reached the play-offs; losing out to New Mexico United in the opening round.

Paços de Ferreira
On 5 January 2021, Parano completed a move to Portuguese football with Primeira Liga side Paços de Ferreira; penning a three-and-a-half year contract.

Chania FC (loan)
Parano spent the 2021-22 season on loan with Super League Greece 2 club Chania FC.

San Antonio FC (loan)
On 17 August 2022, San Antonio announced that Parano would return to the club on loan from Paços de Ferreira for the remainder of the 2022 USL Championship season.

Return to San Antonio FC
On 2 February 2023, San Antonio FC announced that they had signed Parano to return to the club as a regular member.

Career statistics
.

Honours
San Antonio FC
USL Championship Young Player of the Year: 2019

References

1999 births
Living people
Sportspeople from Tucumán Province
Argentine footballers
Association football midfielders
Argentine expatriate footballers
Expatriate soccer players in the United States
Expatriate footballers in Portugal
Argentine expatriate sportspeople in the United States
Argentine expatriate sportspeople in Portugal
Argentine Primera División players
USL Championship players
San Martín de San Juan footballers
San Antonio FC players
F.C. Paços de Ferreira players